The Microregion of Ijuí was one of the Microregions of the Rio Grande do Sul state, in Brazil. It belonged to the mesoregion of the Noroeste Rio-Grandense. Its population was estimated by the IBGE to be of 183.142 inhabitants in 2005, and it was divided in 15 Municipalities. Its total area was of 5.100,402 km². The IBGE has since discontinued the microregion system for population tracking, replacing it with the term "immediate geographic region".

Municípios 
 Ajuricaba
 Alegria
 Augusto Pestana
 Bozano
 Chiapetta
 Condor
 Coronel Barros
 Coronel Bicaco
 Ijuí
 Inhacorá
 Nova Ramada
 Panambi
 Pejuçara
 Santo Augusto
 São Valério do Sul

References 

Microregions of Rio Grande do Sul